Paolo Manalo is a Filipino poet who teaches at the College of Arts and Letters, University of the Philippines. For a time he served as the literary editor of the Philippines Free Press.

Jolography, his first book of poems, received the 1st prize in poetry from the 2002 Palanca Awards and the 2004 U.P. Gawad Chancellor Para sa Natatanging Likha ng Sining (Outstanding Literary Work).

He earned his Ph.D. creative writing at the University of St Andrews.

References

External links
Author profile on panitikan.com.ph
Poetry on 2nd Ave Poetry

21st-century Filipino poets
Filipino journalists
University of the Philippines alumni
Living people
Filipino male poets
21st-century male writers
Year of birth missing (living people)